Laksnes was a  cargo ship that was built in 1927 by Flensburger Schiffbau-Gesellschaft, Flensburg, Germany as Marquardt Petersen for German owners. She was sold in 1935 and renamed Sexta. Another sale in 1938 saw her renamed Annelis Christophersen.

She was seized by the Allies in 1945. Annelis Christophersen was passed to the Ministry of War Transport (MoWT) and renamed Empire Concern. In 1946, she was passed to the Norwegian Government and renamed Laksnes. She ran aground on 27 November 1946 and subsequently sank.

Description
The ship was built in 1927 by Flensburger Schiffbau-Gesellschaft, Flensburg.

She had a GRT of 1,581 and a NRT of 937. Her DWT was 2,650.

The engine was built by Flensburger Schiffbau-Gesellschaft.

History
Marquardt Petersen was built for Morquardt Petersen Reederei GmbH. Her port of registry was Flensburg and the Code Letters LNTH were allocated. Her Code Letters were changed to DDTF in 1934. In 1935, she was sold to Flensburger Dampfschiff Gesellschaft von 1839 and was renamed Sexta. In 1936, Sexta was one of 20 ships chartered to transport timber from Leningrad, Soviet Union to Germany. In 1938, Sexta was sold to H W Christophersen, Flensburg and was renamed Annelis Christophersen.

All four torpedoes missed their target. In May 1945, Annelis Christophersen was seized by the Allies at Flensburg. She was passed to the MoWT and renamed Empire Concern. She was placed under the management of Harries, Brothers & Co Ltd. Her port of registry was London, the code letters GFKQ and United Kingdom Official Number 180639 were allocated. In 1946, Empire Concern was passed to the Norwegian Government and was renamed Laksnes. Her port of registry was Oslo and she was allocated the Code Letters LLTM. On 23 November 1946, F N Nordbø, Haugesund agreed to buy the ship. On 27 November, Laksnes ran aground at Rongevær, Norway. She broke in two and then sank. She was on a voyage from Brevik to Namsos with a cargo of cement. The wreck was raised and scrapped in 1950.

References

External links
Photo of Marquard Petersen

1927 ships
Ships built in Flensburg
Steamships of Germany
Merchant ships of Germany
World War II merchant ships of Germany
Ministry of War Transport ships
Empire ships
Merchant ships of the United Kingdom
Steamships of the United Kingdom
Merchant ships of Norway
Steamships of Norway
Maritime incidents in 1946
Shipwrecks in the North Sea